Online shopping in Bangladesh has been a part of Bangladeshi commerce for years. A recent survey shows that Bangladesh is an emerging market for the online sectors and it has a growing market of around 2 billion BDT. The introduction of 3G mobile internet boosted the online retail industry significantly. The main items sold are clothing, electronics, toiletries and gifts.

Classified and online shopping websites 
There are a number of free classified websites and online shopping marketplaces in Bangladesh. According to Prothom Alo in 2014, about 1.5 to 2 million people shopped online every year, and the market was growing by 15% to 20%. According to MetrixLab, in 2014, internet users in Bangladesh had 1 billion used goods in their stocks worth BDT 14,700 crore (US$1.9 billion as of 2014). According to the Bangladesh Bank, around 1 million clients accessed mobile banking, and over 100 crore transactions were made through mobile banking accounts by 2014. According to The Independent, transactions worth about BDT 1,000 crore (US$123 million as of 2017) have been made annually through e-commerce.

References

Further reading
 

E-commerce in Bangladesh
Economy of Bangladesh
Internet in Bangladesh